Gallis Hill is a  mountain in the Catskill Mountains region of New York. It is located northwest of Kingston in Ulster County. Jockey Hill is located north-northeast, and Morgan Hill is located west of Gallis Hill. In 1927, the Conservation Department built a steel fire lookout tower on the mountain. In 1950, the tower was closed and disassembled then moved to Overlook Mountain, where it still remains today.

History
In 1927, the Conservation Department built a  Aermotor LS40 steel tower. The first standard design for the observer cabins was made in 1922, which had to be  in size and roofed/sided with asphalt shingles. A cabin of this design was built on the mountain the same time as the tower. The summit was accessed via a short train ride from Kingston, which brought visitors near the tower.

References

Mountains of Ulster County, New York
Mountains of New York (state)